Anolis festae, Veronica's anole, is a species of lizard in the family Dactyloidae. The species is found in Ecuador and Colombia.

References

Anoles
Reptiles described in 1904
Reptiles of Ecuador
Reptiles of Colombia
Taxa named by Mario Giacinto Peracca